A bolt is a form of threaded fastener with an external male thread requiring a matching pre-formed female thread such as a nut. Bolts are very closely related to screws.

Uses 
Bolts are among the most versatile and widely used fasteners in various applications. From construction projects such as bridges, buildings and frameworks to everyday items like furniture, bicycles and vehicle engines – bolts can be found at work in almost all industries. Threaded studs or bolts provide an extremely reliable connection for electrical components due to their higher physical strength than other fasteners. Bolts are also necessary for securing doors or gates – providing an effective framework for deadbolts or padlocks to latch onto. Such a wide range of uses for bolts makes them invaluable for construction and maintenance projects across all fields.

Bolts vs. screws 

The distinction between a bolt and a screw is poorly-defined. The academic distinction, per Machinery's Handbook, is in their intended design: bolts are designed to pass through an unthreaded hole in a component and be fastened with the aid of a nut, although such a fastener can be used without a nut to tighten into a threaded component such as a nut-plate or tapped housing. Screws in contrast are used in components which contain their own thread, or to cut its own internal thread into them. This definition allows ambiguity in the description of a fastener depending on the application it is actually used for, and the terms screw and bolt are widely used by different people or in different countries to apply to the same or varying fastener.

Bolts are often used to make a bolted joint. This is a combination of the nut applying an axial clamping force and also the shank of the bolt acting as a dowel, pinning the joint against sideways shear forces. For this reason, many bolts have a plain unthreaded shank (called the ) as this makes for a better, stronger dowel. The presence of the unthreaded shank has often been given as characteristic of bolts vs. screws, but this is incidental to its use, rather than defining.

Where a fastener forms its own thread in the component being fastened, it is called a screw. This is most obviously so when the thread is tapered (i.e. traditional wood screws), precluding the use of a nut, or when a sheet metal screw or other thread-forming screw is used. A screw must always be turned to assemble the joint. Many bolts are held fixed in place during assembly, either by a tool or by a design of non-rotating bolt, such as a carriage bolt, and only the corresponding nut is turned.

Bolt heads 

Bolts use a wide variety of head designs, as do screws. These are designed to engage with the tool used to tighten them. Some bolt heads instead lock the bolt in place, so that it does not move and a tool is only needed for the nut end.

Common bolt heads include hex, slotted hex washer, and socket cap.

The first bolts had square heads, formed by forging. These are still found, although much more common today is the hexagonal head. These are held and turned by a spanner or socket, of which there are many forms. Most are held from the side, some from in-line with the bolt. Other bolts have T-heads and slotted heads. 

Many bolts use a screwdriver head fitting, rather than an external wrench. Screwdrivers are applied in-line with the fastener, rather than from the side. These are smaller than most wrench heads and cannot usually apply the same amount of torque. It is sometimes assumed that screwdriver heads imply a screw and wrenches imply a bolt, although this is incorrect. Coach screws are large square-headed screws with a tapered wood screw thread, used for attaching ironwork to timber. Head designs that overlap both bolts and screws are the Allen or Torx heads; hexagonal or splined sockets. These modern designs span a large range of sizes and can carry a considerable torque. Threaded fasteners with screwdriver-style heads are often referred to as machine screws whether they are being used with a nut or not.

Bolt types 

Anchor bolt - Bolt designed to allow objects to be attached to concrete. The bolt head is usually placed in concrete before it has cured or placed before the concrete is poured, leaving the threaded end exposed.
Arbor bolt - Bolt with a washer permanently attached and reversed threading. Designed for use in miter saw and other tools to auto tighten during use to prevent blade fall out.
Carriage bolt - Bolt with a smooth rounded head and a square section to prevent turning followed with a threaded section for a nut.
Elevator bolt - Bolt with a large flat head used in conveyor system setups.
Hanger bolt - Bolt that has no head, machine threaded body followed by a wood threaded screw tip. Allow nuts to be attached to what is really a screw.
Hex bolt - Bolt with a hexagonal head and threaded body. Section immediately under head may or may not be threaded.
J bolt - Bolt shaped like the letter J. Used for tie downs. Only the non curved section is threaded for a nut to be attached.
Lag bolt - Also known as lag screw. Not a true bolt. Hex bolt head with thread screw tip for use in wood.
Rock bolt - Used in tunnel construction to stabilize walls.
Sex bolt or Chicago bolt - Bolt that has a male and female part with interior threads and bolt heads on either end. Commonly used in paper binding.
Shoulder bolt or stripper bolt - Bolt with a broad smooth shoulder and small threaded end used to create a pivot or attachment point.
U-bolt - Bolt shaped like the letter U where the two straight sections are threaded. A straight metal plate with two bolt holes is used with nuts to hold pipes or other round objects to the U-bolt.
Cane bolt - Also called a drop rod, a cane bolt is not a threaded fastener. It is a type of gate latch that consists of a long metal rod with a curved handle and attaches to a gate by one or more fasteners. This type of bolt was named after the shape of a cane, similar to the shape of a candy cane or walking cane.

Bolt materials 

Depending on required strength and circumstances, there are several material types can be used for fasteners.
 Steel fasteners (grade 2,5,8) - the level of strength
 Stainless steel fasteners (martensitic stainless steel, austenitic stainless steel), 
 Bronze and brass fasteners - water proof usage
 Nylon fasteners - used for the light material and water proof usage. 

In general, steel is the most commonly used material of all fasteners: 90% or more.

Bolted joints

The American Institute of Steel Construction (AISC) 13th Edition Steel Design Manual section 16.1 chapter J-3 specifies the requirements for bolted structural connections. Structural bolts replaced rivets due to the decreasing cost and increasing strength of structural bolts in the 20th century. Connections are formed with two types of joints: slip-critical connections and bearing connections. In slip-critical connections, movement of the connected parts is a serviceability condition and bolts are tightened to a minimum required pre-tension. Slip is prevented through friction of the "faying" surface, that is the plane of shear for the bolt and where two members make contact. Because friction is proportional to the normal force, connections must be sized with bolts numerous and large enough to provide the required load capacity. However, this greatly decreases the shear capacity of each bolt in the connection. The second (and more common type) of connection is a bearing connection. In this type of connection, the bolts carry the load through shear and are only tightened to a "snug-fit". These connections require fewer bolts than slip-critical connections and therefore are a less expensive alternative. Slip-critical connections are more common on flange plates for beam and column splices and moment critical connections. Bearing type connections are used in lightweight structures and in member connections where slip is not important and prevention of structural failure is the design constraint. Common bearing type connections include: shear tabs, beam supports, gusset plates in trusses.

See also 

 ASTM A325, standard for bolts  to  inches in diameter
 ISO 898, standard for metric bolts
 Mechanical joint
Screw thread
Socket wrench
 Thread angle
Thread-locking compound
 Thread pitch gauge
Torque wrench

References 

Screws
Threaded fasteners
Fasteners